Vincent Lepvraud (born 28 July 1970) is a French rower. He competed in the men's quadruple sculls event at the 1996 Summer Olympics.

References

External links
 

1970 births
Living people
French male rowers
Olympic rowers of France
Rowers at the 1996 Summer Olympics
People from Niort
Sportspeople from Deux-Sèvres